Carolyn M. Gilman (born July 17, 1939) is an American politician from Maine. Gilman, a Republican, served in the Maine State Senate from 2002 to 2004, representing her residence in Westbrook, Maine and nearby areas of Cumberland County.

She was defeated for re-election in 2004 by Democrat Phil Bartlett after redistricting changed the district.

Personal
Gilman earned a A.A. from Westbrook College in 1959. Senator Gilman has been married Robert W Gilman for over 60 years. They raised 5 wonderful children. Jenifer Parent of Westbrook, ME, the late Robert W Gilman Jr of Benedica, ME, Tim Gilman of South Portland, ME,  Matthew Gilman of Gorham, ME and her favorite Benjamin Gilman of Gorham, ME. SenatorGilman has 10 grandchildren and 5 great grandchildren.

References

1939 births
Living people
Politicians from Portland, Maine
Politicians from Westbrook, Maine
Westbrook College alumni
Republican Party Maine state senators
Women state legislators in Maine
21st-century American politicians
21st-century American women politicians